Mitchell Altieri is an American film director, producer and writer.

Career 
His first feature film Lurking in Suburbia was discovered by Sundance Film Festival programmer Trevor Groth. Altieri and long time film partner Phil Flores then created their filmmaking alter-egos The Butcher Brothers, writing and directing the independent horror film The Hamiltons.

Filmography 
Star Light (2020)
The Night Watchmen (2017)
A Beginner's Guide to Snuff (2016)
Raised by Wolves (2014)
Holy Ghost People (2013)
The Thompsons (2012)
The Violent Kind (2010)
April Fool's Day (2008)
The Hamiltons (2006)
Lurking in Suburbia (2006)
Long Cut (2002)

References

External links 

1997 Interview with Mitchell Altieri and Phil Flores by David Templeton, Metro Active
2002 Interview with Mitchell Altieri and Phil Flores by Daedalus Howell, SF Chronicle
2005 The Wild Bunch by David Templeton, Metro Active
2005 Article on Altieri and Zaentz by Daedalus Howell, SF Chronicle

People from Sonoma County, California
Year of birth missing (living people)
Living people
Film directors from California
Screenwriters from California
Film producers from California